Year 966 (CMLXVI) was a common year starting on Monday (link will display the full calendar) of the Julian calendar.

Events 
 By place 
 Byzantine Empire 
 23 June - Byzantine-Arab War: A prisoner exchange occurs at the border between the Byzantine Empire and the Emirate of Aleppo at Samosata, headed by Emperor Nikephoros II and Sayf al-Dawla, the Emir of Aleppo. The Emirate receives 3,000 captured prisoners from the region of Cilicia, after its conquest by the Byzantine Emperor, as well as the poet Abu Firas, who had been previously held prisoner by the Byzantines.
 Europe 
 Spring – King Lothair III marries Princess Emma of Italy (the only daughter of Adelaide of Burgundy — second wife of Emperor Otto I (the Great), from her first marriage with King Lothair II, member of the Bosonid Dynasty). Lothair strengthens his ties with the Holy Roman Empire. He temporarily remains in control of the cities of Arras and Douai. The latter becomes a flourishing textile market centre during the Middle Ages.
 April 14 – Mieszko I, first duke and prince of Poland, is baptized a Christian, which is usually considered the foundation of the Polish state. Mieszko's baptism, under the influence of his wife Dobrawa, brings his territories into the community of Christian countries. The lands ruled by Mieszko cover about 250,000 km², and are inhabited by about 1,2 million people around this time.
 May – Pietro IV Candiano, doge of Venice, remarries to Waldrada of Tuscany, a daughter of Hubert, Duke of Spoleto, and a relative of Otto I. Waldrada brings him a large dowry, including the possessions of Ferrara, Friuli and Treviso (Northern Italy).
 Fall – Otto I departs for a third expedition in Italy and fights in Lombardy against the partisans under Adalbert II of Ivrea. In November an imperial counter-coup in Rome takes control of Castel Sant'Angelo.
 Winter – Otto I enters Rome and has the twelve principal militia leaders (the Decarcones) hanged. Other plotters of the coup are either executed or blinded. Otto is declared 'liberator of the Church'. 
 The Hungarians invade the Bulgarian Empire and force Peter I, emperor (tsar) of the Bulgarians, to conclude a peace treaty with them. He lets them cross to attack the Byzantine Empire.

 Asia 
 February 9 – Ono no Michikaze (Ono no Tōfū), Japanese calligrapher, dies after having established the foundations of the 'Waystyle' of calligraphy while serving the imperial court at Heian-kyō (modern-day Kyoto).

 By topic 
 Religion 
 John VII, patriarch of Jerusalem, is burned at the stake by a Muslim mob after writing to Emperor Nikephoros II, pleading him to intervene in Palestine and retake it from the Fatimid Caliphate.
 Re-foundation of Peterborough (also called Medeshamstede) Abbey as a Benedictine monastery by Bishop Æthelwold of Winchester (approximate date).

Births 
 Æthelred II (the Unready), king of England (approximate date)
 Ali al-Sulayhi, sultan of Yemen, Tihamah and Mecca (d. 1066)
 Ding Wei, grand chancellor of the Song Dynasty (d. 1037)
 Fujiwara no Kintō, Japanese poet and bureaucrat (d. 1041)
 Fujiwara no Michinaga, Japanese nobleman (d. 1028)
 Gerberga of Burgundy, duchess of Swabia (or 965)
 Heonjeong, queen of Goryeo (Korea) (d. 992)
 Hisham II, caliph of Córdoba (Spain) (d. 1013)
 Kenneth III, king of Scotland (approximate date)
 Louis V, king of the West Frankish Kingdom (d. 987)
 Lu Zongdao, Chinese official (approximate date)
 Sei Shōnagon, Japanese poet and court lady (approximate date)

Deaths 
 January 19 – Fujiwara no Asatada, Japanese nobleman (b. 910)
 February 9 – Ono no Michikaze, Japanese calligrapher (b. 894)
 March 28 – Flodoard, Frankish canon and chronicler
 August 4 – Berengar II, margrave and king of Italy  
 December 19 – Sancho I, king of León (Spain)
 Abu Ishaq Ibrahim, Samanid governor
 Abu'l-Hasan Ali, Ikhshidid governor
 Bagrat II, prince of Tao-Klarjeti (Georgia)
 Bertha of Swabia, Frankish queen consort
 Cormac ua Cillín, abbot of Tuamgraney (Ireland)
 John VII, patriarch of Jerusalem (Israel)
 Viśa' Saṃbhava, king of Khotan (China)
 Nako, Obotrite prince (approximate date)
 Rashiq al-Nasimi, Hamdanid governor
 Sergius I, duke of Amalfi (Italy)

References